Ali Sabri (30 August 1920 – 3 August 1991) was an Egyptian politician of Turkish origin.

Family background 
His parents, Dewlet Shamsi (mother) and Abbas-Baligh Sabri (father) were of Turkish-Circassian descent and belonged to the privileged class.

Ali Sabri was a grandson of nationalist Amin Shamsi Pasha (1833-1913) a member of the General Assembly and Provincial Council who in 1881-82 was a principal financial backer of Ahmed Urabi Pasha. Following the failure of what historian term the "Urabi Rebellion" of 1882, Khedive Tewfik imprisoned Shamsi Pasha later releasing him on a hefty bail. He resumed his seat at the General Assembly until his death.

Sabri was also a nephew of Ali Shamsi Pasha (1885-1962) co-founder of the Wafd Party and a several-time minister during the reign of Fuad I of Egypt later to become the first Egyptian to head of the National Bank of Egypt which acted as the country's Central Bank.

One of Ali Sabri's paternal grand-uncles was Mohammed Faizi Pasha (1840-1911), a director-general of the Awqaf Department during the reign of Khedive Abbas Hilmi II.

The trilingual Ali Sabri, along with his three brothers and one sister, was raised in the then-predominantly aristocratic and European Cairo suburb of Maadi and was an active member of its Sporting Club's tennis and swimming teams.

Egyptian revolution  and premiership 

Sabri was one of the second row of 1952 revolution officers, he was the head of Egyptian General Intelligence Directorate from 1956 to 1957.  He was the 32nd Prime Minister of Egypt from September 1962 to October 1965.

When Gamal Abdel Nasser died in 1970, Anwar Sadat was regarded as Nasser's most likely successor, but Sabri was regarded as the next most likely. Both Sadat and Sabri had heart attacks which they survived at Nasser's funeral.

Sabri was the vice-president and regarded as the no. 2 figure in Sadat's government. However shortly after Sadat came to power he was the most notable casualty of Sadat's "Corrective Revolution", and was imprisoned.

Regarded as a diehard socialist, he was often criticized for his upper-class background. Ali Sabri died in Cairo on 3 August 1991, aged 70.

Honour

Foreign honour
 Malaysia: 
 Honorary Grand Commander of the Order of the Defender of the Realm (SMN (K)) - Tun (1965)

References

External links

1920 births
1991 deaths
20th-century prime ministers of Egypt
Prime Ministers of Egypt
Egyptian people of Turkish descent
Vice-presidents of Egypt
Arab Socialist Union (Egypt) politicians
Free Officers Movement (Egypt)
Honorary Grand Commanders of the Order of the Defender of the Realm
Directors of the General Intelligence Directorate (Egypt)